The Butcher Boy is a 1997 Irish black comedy film directed by Neil Jordan. The film was based on Patrick McCabe’s 1992 novel of the same name and McCabe co-wrote the screenplay with Jordan.

Set in the early 1960s, The Butcher Boy is about Francie Brady (Eamonn Owens), a 12-year-old boy who retreats into a violent fantasy world to escape the reality of his dysfunctional family; as his circumstances worsen, his sanity deteriorates and he begins acting out, with increasing brutality. The film won the Silver Bear for Best Director at the 48th Berlin International Film Festival in 1998 and a Special Mention for Owens "astonishing lead". It also won the European Film Award for Best Cinematographer for Adrian Biddle.

The Butcher Boy was also the final film produced by The Geffen Film Company, and was released before their closure in 1998.

Plot
The film is set in Ireland in the early 1960s in the small town of Clones. Francie Brady is a 12-year-old boy whose imagination is fuelled by television - aliens, communists, the Atomic Age. When his mother suffers a nervous breakdown and ultimately commits suicide, he is left in the care of his father, an emotionally distant and ill-tempered alcoholic. Francie spends most of his time with his best friend Joe Purcell talking about "gangsters, cowboys and Indians, comic-book monsters and the early-1960s threat of nuclear annihilation." However, when Francie's growing conflict with another boy, Phillip Nugent, and his mother begins to go too far, he ends up at reform school. Here, he is molested by Father Sullivan, and finds solace only in his fantasies about a foul-mouthed Virgin Mary. He returns home to find Joe has outgrown him and befriended Phillip Nugent. Before long, his father has drunk himself to death. Faced with being left completely alone in the world, Francie loses his grip on reality and lashes out with uncontrollable brutality, which shocks his provincial hometown.

Cast
 Eamonn Owens as Francie Brady
 Stephen Rea as Benny Brady (Da) / Adult Francie (uncredited)
 Fiona Shaw as Mrs. Nugent
 Andrew Fullerton as Phillip Nugent
 Aisling O'Sullivan as Annie Brady (Ma)
 Alan Boyle as Joe Purcell
 Seán McGinley as Sergeant
 Ian Hart as Uncle Alo
 Brendan Gleeson as Father Bubbles
 Milo O'Shea as Father Sullivan
 Sinéad O'Connor as Virgin Mary / Colleen
 Gina Moxley as Mary
 John Kavanagh as Doctor Boyd
 Niall Buggy as Father Dom

Production
The screen rights to the book were bought by Neil Jordan in 1992 during the filming of Interview with the Vampire. The adaptation is mostly faithful to the novel, but there are some differences, the principal change being the ending. In the book, Francie is not seen to leave prison, and attempts to forge a friendship with an inmate similar to the one he had with Joe. In the film, a much older Francie is released from prison at the end to be brought to a halfway house. He picks a snowdrop, echoing the opening of the film.

Casting the child to play Francie was difficult. With no previous filming experiences, Eamonn Owens and Alan Boyle (who played Francie's best friend, Joe) were found at the local school in Killeshandra in County Cavan where casting assistant Maureen Hughes went to visit her uncle. Owens' younger brother Ciaran was also cast. Jordan cast O'Connor because "she looks like the Virgin Mary."

Adaptation
Patrick McCabe's accomplishment with The Butcher Boy was deemed unattainable in a film. During the screenwriting process, McCabe wrote two drafts that digressed from the original novel, like "planets within planets within planets" according to Jordan, consequently, Jordan wrote the third draft that was more faithful to the novel. Jordan cast McCabe in the role of town drunk Jimmy the Skite.

Jordan captures Francie's mental illness by using voice-overs where the adult narrator Francie speaks with the child Francie. Andrew O'Hehir at Salon Entertainment criticizes Jordan and McCabe for an occasional "flavor of an after-school special purveying didactic lessons about abuse and victimization," and losing "the novel's Beckettian ambiguity." However, he argues that Jordan "brings a tenderness and sweetness" to the otherwise unforgiving subject matter.

Reception
The reception of the film has been generally positive. Review aggregator Rotten Tomatoes shows a 77% rating based on 61 reviews and an average rating of 7.4/10. Andrew O'Hehir at Salon Entertainment says "Neil Jordan's sweetly tragicomic movie" has "elaborate fantasy sequences [that] feel like irrelevant amusements." He also praises the film as "a compelling exploration of the permeable border between normal childhood and full-on insanity."
Jeffrey M. Anderson at Combustible Celluloid calls the film "a roller-coaster ride for your brain. It's the most alive and deeply-felt movie I've seen in 1998." Emanuel Levy at Variety says it is "Neil Jordan's most accomplished and brilliant film to date."

Owens received widespread acclaim for his performance; he was awarded a Special Mention at the Berlin Film Festival in 1998.

The film grossed £1,807,666 ($3 million) in the UK and Ireland, the highest-grossing Irish film of the year. In the United States and Canada, it grossed $1,995,911 for a worldwide total of over $5 million.

Awards
The Butcher Boy won the following awards:

Soundtrack

Elliot Goldenthal composed the soundtrack for the film, which was released on CD in 1998. Goldenthal for this score mixes many different music genres and styles, yet this is one of his most melodic scores. The title song is performed by Sinéad O'Connor.

DVD release
A widescreen, closed-captioned version of the film was released on DVD on 13 February 2007 by Warner Home Video. The disc contains deleted scenes and an audio commentary by Neil Jordan.

References

External links
 
 
 
 

1997 films
1997 comedy-drama films
Irish comedy-drama films
English-language Irish films
American comedy-drama films
1990s English-language films
Films directed by Neil Jordan
Fiction with unreliable narrators
Magic realism films
Films about mental health
Films about dysfunctional families
Films based on Irish novels
The Geffen Film Company films
Warner Bros. films
Portrayals of the Virgin Mary in film
Films scored by Elliot Goldenthal
1990s American films